Plesiobasis is a genus of fungus weevil.

Included species (9)
 Plesiobasis brunneovarius Frieser, 1992
 Plesiobasis centralis Wolfrum, 1959
 Plesiobasis charax Jordan, 1939
 Plesiobasis dorsalis Kuschel, 1998
 Plesiobasis externa Wolfrum, 1959
 Plesiobasis grallina Jordan, 1939
 Plesiobasis monera Jordan, 1939
 Plesiobasis multiguttatus Frieser, 1992
 Plesiobasis phelos Jordan, 1939

References 

Anthribidae
Weevil genera